The 2010 United Football League (known as the LBC United Football League for sponsorship reasons) was the first season of the United Football League. After the success of UFL Cup, the clubs that would comprise the Division 1 and Division 2 was set. The season began on 24 January 2010.

The Philippine Air Force won the first season league title in the Division 1.

Global was successfully promoted to 2011 United Football League (Philippines) Division 1 after topping the second division with an unbeaten record.

Division 1

Division 2

References

   
United Football League (Philippines) seasons
1
Phil
Phil